Richland Plantation is a plantation comprising a historic plantation house located at 7240 Azalea Street (LA 422), about  east of Norwood, Louisiana.

Elias Norwood built the house in 1820 following the typical layout of the period with a large central hall separating rooms on either side.

The  area comprising the mansion was added to the National Register of Historic Places on March 28, 1979.

See also
National Register of Historic Places listings in East Feliciana Parish, Louisiana

References

Houses on the National Register of Historic Places in Louisiana
Federal architecture in Louisiana
Houses completed in 1835
Houses in East Feliciana Parish, Louisiana
National Register of Historic Places in East Feliciana Parish, Louisiana